The story of King Canute and the tide is an apocryphal anecdote illustrating the piety or humility of King Canute the Great, recorded in the 12th century by Henry of Huntingdon.

In the story, Canute demonstrates to his flattering courtiers that he has no control over the elements (the incoming tide), explaining that secular power is vain compared to the supreme power of God. The episode is frequently alluded to in contexts where the futility of "trying to stop the tide" of an inexorable event is pointed out, but usually misrepresenting Canute as believing he had supernatural powers, when Huntingdon's story in fact relates the opposite.

The episode

In Huntingdon's account, Canute set his throne by the sea shore and commanded the incoming tide to halt and not wet his feet and robes. Yet "continuing to rise as usual [the tide] dashed over his feet and legs without respect to his royal person. Then the king leapt backwards, saying: 'Let all men know how empty and worthless is the power of kings, for there is none worthy of the name, but He whom heaven, earth, and sea obey by eternal laws. He then hung his gold crown on a crucifix, and never wore it again "to the honour of God the almighty King".

Later historians repeated the story, most of them adjusting it to have Canute more clearly aware that the tides would not obey him, and staging the scene to rebuke the flattery of his courtiers.
There are also earlier parallels in Celtic stories of men who commanded the tides, namely Saint Illtud of Glamorgan, Maelgwn, king of Gwynedd, and Tuirbe, of Tuirbe's Strand in Brittany.

Proverbial reference
Proverbial reference to the legend in modern journalism or politics usually casts the story in terms of "Canute's arrogance" of "attempting to stop the tide". As to usage, however, The Economist'''s Style Guide writes:

It was cited, for example, by Stacy Head as typifying the New Orleans city council's response to Hurricane Katrina (2005), or by Mark Stephens in reference to Ryan Giggs as "the King Canute of football" for his attempts of stopping "the unstoppable tide of information" on the internet in the 2011 British privacy injunctions controversy. This, and many other popular representations, are a misrepresentation of Huntingdon's account, in which Canute uses the tide to demonstrate his precise inability to control the elements and his deference to the greater authority of God.

Theodore Dalrymple refers to the story, without misattributing motives of arrogance to Canute, in the context of the British reaction to the Ukraine crisis (2014), saying 

Warren Burger, the Chief Justice of the United States, mentions Canute in the 1980 decision Diamond v. Chakrabarty (447 U.S. 303), stating the denial of a patent for a micro-organism "is not likely to put an end to genetic research". Burger likens doing so to Canute commanding the tides.

Historicity and possible location
The contemporary Encomium Emmae'' has no mention of the episode, which has been taken as indicating its ahistoricity, as it would seem that so pious a dedication might have been recorded there since the same source gives an "eye-witness account of his lavish gifts to the monasteries and poor of St Omer when on the way to Rome, and of the tears and breast-beating which accompanied them".

Goscelin, writing later in the 11th century, instead has Canute place his crown on a crucifix at Winchester one Easter with no mention of the sea and "with the explanation that the king of kings was more worthy of it than he". Nevertheless, there may be a "basis of fact, in a planned act of piety" behind this story. 

On the other hand, Malcolm Godden says the story is simply "a 12th Century legend... and those 12th Century historians were always making up stories about kings from Anglo-Saxon times".

The site of the episode is often identified as Thorney Island (now known as Westminster), where Canute set up a royal palace during his reign over London. Thorney Island is also a small peninsula within Chichester harbour, very close to another claimed location, Bosham, and conflictingly a sign on Southampton city centre's Canute Road reads, "Near this spot AD 1028 Canute reproved his courtiers". Bosham in West Sussex also claims to be the site of this episode, as does Gainsborough in Lincolnshire. As Gainsborough is inland, if the story is true then Canute would have been trying to turn back the tidal bore known as the aegir. Another tradition places this episode on the north coast of the Wirral, which at the time was part of Mercia.

See also
Cultural depictions of Cnut the Great
 Xerxes I's whipping of the Hellespont

References

External links
J. P. Sommerville, King Canute (= Cnut) and the waves

Canute
12th-century introductions
12th-century literature
Medieval legends
British legends
London folklore
Hampshire folklore
West Sussex folklore
Modesty